Bárbara Muschietti (born December 22, 1971) is an Argentine film producer and screenwriter, best known for producing the 2013 horror film Mama and the 2017 and 2019 adaptations of Stephen King's It, all of which were directed by her brother, Andy Muschietti.

Personal life

She is of Italian descent. She is married to writer Arthur Phillips.

Producer credits

References

External links 

 

Living people
Argentine film producers
Argentine screenwriters
Horror film directors
Place of birth missing (living people)
Argentine people of Italian descent
1971 births